The OCR Kings, extreme athletes "Mack (a martial arts instructor) and Damer (a semi-pro lacrosse player)" based in Danbury, Connecticut "attempt to dominate in the world of obstacle course racing by recreating the grueling challenges and obstacles of actual OCR's and developing the best methods of conquering them." The OCR Kings' stated mission is helping others to succeed in their fitness journey, especially in running and Obstacle Course Racing. They vow "to encourage and/or assist anyone, regardless of age or level of athleticism."

The OCR Kings produce obstacle race video content leveraging YouTube and other social media platforms.  They are described as  "the missing link between average joe's and elite"  competitive racers, by producing race and mud run video content, tutorials, virtual races, and gear reviews for participants of all experience levels.

"We set out to find the best ways to compete in OCR's, like Spartan Race, Tough Mudder, and Warrior Dash, by creating our own course in the backwoods, after work, at night, after the kids are in bed. Then we film and share what we learn," says Mack. When describing their approach, Damer states that "everybody likes to know what they're up against ahead of time. We'll show you how to survive an OCR from the start line, to the free beer at the end of the course."

Members 
Mack
Damer

Videos 
Spartan Race Ultra Beast All Obstacles
Tough Mudder Half All Obstacles
Spartan Super All Obstacles
Savage Race All Obstacles
Spartan Race Citi Field All Obstacles
Warrior Dash All Obstacles
Rugged Maniac All Obstacles
Bone Frog Challenge All Obstacles
OCR Training Multi Rig
OCR Training Rope Traverse
OCR Training Rope Climbing
OCR Training Wall Obstacles

References

External links 
Official website
Videos
VoyageJacksonville Magazine
Benzinga
CanvasRebel Magazine
Benzinga
Podcast

Sportspeople from Danbury, Connecticut
American YouTubers
Sports YouTubers
YouTube channels launched in 2015